is an athlete from Japan who competes in archery. She was the 2007 World Indoor Women’s Recurve Champion in the competition held in Izmir, Turkey that year.

Personal life
Nami has a younger sister, Ren who is also an Olympic archer and competed in 2012 Summer Olympics.

2008 Summer Olympics
At the 2008 Summer Olympics in Beijing Hayakawa finished her ranking round with a total of 649 points. This gave her the 9th seed for the final competition bracket in which she faced Elena Mousikou in the first round, beating the archer from Cyprus with 112-103. In the second round she was too strong for Jennifer Nichols with 105-103 and via Naomi Folkard with 106-97 she reached the quarter finals. There she was eliminated with 112-103 by Park Sung-hyun who would eventually win the silver medal. Together with Sayoko Kitabatake and Yuki Hayashi she also took part in the team event. With her 649 score from the ranking round combined with the 616's of Kitabatake and Hayashi the Japanese team was in seventh position after the ranking round. In the first round they eliminated the Colombian team with 206-199. However second seed Great Britain was too strong in the quarter final, beating Japan with 201-196.

References

1984 births
Living people
People from Jeonju
Archers at the 2008 Summer Olympics
Japanese female archers
Japanese people of Korean descent
Naturalized citizens of Japan
Olympic archers of Japan
South Korean emigrants to Japan